Wauchope is a town in the Mid North Coast region of New South Wales, Australia. It is within the boundaries of the Port Macquarie-Hastings Council area.

Wauchope is the location of Timbertown, a popular heritage theme park inspired by the logging industry that formed the basis for Wauchope's early economy and prosperity.  The town has a population of approximately 7,500 (as of 2006 - including King Creek & Redbank).  It has also played an important role in the Hastings Valley dairy industry.

History
The Birpai (also known as Birrbay) people have lived in this area for more than 40,000 years.

By 1828 a number of land grants had been made along the Hastings River. It was not until 1836 that the village of Wauchope first came into existence. He bought more property and built Wauch House.

Robert Wauch died in the Macleay area in 1866, and the Government Gazette published the deeds of his properties, specifying that they should be called Wauchope. When the post office opened in a nearby settlement in 1881, it was named Wauchope, although the Government Gazette misprinted the name Wanghope, an error that was not corrected until 1889.

It is pronounced war-hope, although the family pronounced their name 'war-cope'. This is similar to the Canadian town which is pronounced 'walk-up'. The Wauchope family currently pronounce their name 'war-cope'.

Floods

The 1968 flood was estimated to be slightly rarer than a 100-year event.
The next largest flood was determined to be the flood of 5 to 7 March 1894. This flood reached a peak flood level of 8.9 m AHD at Wauchope.

Other major floods occurred at Wauchope in February 1950 (8.45 m AHD), February 1929 (8.3 m AHD), August 1864 (8.2 m AHD), and June 1950 (8.1 m AHD).

The 1963 flood, which is notorious for the damage it caused in the lower reaches of the river, is only ranked as the eighth highest flood at Wauchope. It reached a peak level at Wauchope of 7.75 m AHD and was considered to be a 1 in 15-year event at Wauchope.

On 23 February 2013 floodwaters peaked at 7.22 m AHD at 7.30pm after heavy rainfall in the upper catchment area.

Industry and economy
Wauchope's economy was traditionally based on the timber industry. At different stages in its history, more timber was transported out of Wauchope than out of any other town in Australia (via Wauchope railway station). Timber from Wauchope was used in the construction of the Sydney Opera House.

Industry in and around Wauchope has transformed primarily into farming and tourism. Increasingly, Wauchope and its surrounding villages and farms are becoming known for gourmet produce, including cheeses, wines and organic fruits and vegetables. The Hastings Farmers Markets are held at the Wauchope Showground on the 4th Saturday of every month and showcase a wide variety of local produce.

Timbertown, the town's best-known tourist attraction, is a colonial-era themed village, which is located on the outskirts of Wauchope. It features static displays and attractions such as a working steam train, bullock team, and a Cobb and Co stage coach.
The Big Bull was a notable tourist attraction between Wauchope and Port Macquarie for twenty years, but was removed in 2007.

Other important attractions include the historical society, historic buildings, Broken Bago vineyards and natural attractions including state forests and Bago Bluff National Park.

Wauchope railway station serves as an interchange for passengers travelling to nearby coastal centres such as Port Macquarie.

Layout
The township is set out along the southern bank of the Hastings River with the back drop of Bago Mountain further south.

The main street is High Street (a small section of the Oxley Highway), running generally westward through the town after coming east from Port Macquarie and across the North Coast railway line.  The main street includes the Co-op general store (previously Parkers) and a number of smaller businesses and local bank branches.  At the corner of Hastings Street is the local post office.  Further up the main street is the town clock, a legacy of the days the town was the centre of the Hastings Shire local government area.  Back along Hastings Street is the Co-op supermarket as well as the court house. In 2009 work commenced on the rebuilding of this supermarket. The old building was completely demolished and a much larger and more modern structure was completed and opened in 2010.

The main cross street is Cameron Street. The Hastings Hotel is on the south-east corner of Cameron and High and the Star Hotel is a short distance north. Cameron Street leads to the Hastings River. A wharf was built at the northern end of Cameron Street for shipping produce downstream to Port Macquarie, but this no longer exists.

South of the main shopping area is the Wauchope Golf Course and Country Club, which occupies a premium site within the middle of the town.  Further west is Timbertown, on the edge of large tracts of forestry land leading into the Bago Mountain area.

East of the main shopping area is the railway line from Sydney.  The Hastings dairy and milk factory is located close to the point where the railway line crosses the Hastings River.

Schools
 Wauchope Public School
 St Joseph's Primary School
 Wauchope High School

Wauchope has its own railway station on the North Coast Line of New South Wales. It is serviced by six NSW TrainLink trains per day 3 heading South (to Sydney), 3 heading further north to Grafton, Casino, and Brisbane. Passengers can alight at this station for connecting coaches to the nearby Port Macquarie.

People from Wauchope
 Bill Bain - Emmy award-winning TV director
 Iva Davies - Musician, Icehouse
 Reginald Elliott Davies - Former Independent Member of Western Australian Parliament and Member of Special Air Service Regiment
 Rhali Dobson - Professional W-League footballer for Melbourne City
 Angus Gill - Musician
 Phil Jamieson - Musician, Grinspoon
 Allison Langdon - television presenter and journalist, co-host of Today show
 Mark Laurie - former professional rugby league footballer
 Robert Laurie - former professional rugby league footballer
 Ian Schubert - former professional rugby league footballer and current NRL Salary Cap auditor.
 Andrew Stoner - NSW National Party of Australia leader, Member for Oxley
 Rex Terp - former professional rugby league footballer
 Nicholas Kelly - competitive powerlifter

Sister cities
The following city has been identified as a sister city of Wauchope by Sister Cities International:
  Canisteo, New York, United States

References

External links
 Timbertown
 Town History

 
Towns in New South Wales
Mid North Coast